Kandlakunta is a village in veldurthi mandal in the Guntur district of Andhra Pradesh, India..

Villages in Guntur district